The Mommila railway station is located in Hausjärvi, Finland, in the village of Mommila. It is located along the Riihimäki–Lahti line, and its neighboring stations are Oitti in the west and Lappila in the east.

History 
The Mommila station began life as a halt on the outskirts of the village of Torhola. In the 1920s, a full station building designed by Thure Hellström replaced the former platform facility. A village began to form around the station, and its population peaked in the 1960s at over 200 inhabitants.

On 5 April 1977, Mommila became the stage of a destructive derailment accident upon the head-on collision of express train EP 84 and freight train JK 1456.

Mommila became an unmanned station in 1977, its freight transport was abolished in 1990, and its railyard was disassembled in 1997. The level crossing in the northeastern side of the station was replaced by an overpass in 2004; it was opened for use by traffic on 2 November, and the crossing was dismantled the following day. The station house and several of its relevant buildings were transferred to the ownership of Senate Properties in 2007.

Services 

Mommila is an intermediate station on commuter rail line  on the route Riihimäki–Lahti. Westbound trains towards Riihimäki stop at track 1 and eastbound ones towards Lahti use track 2. Prior to the opening of the Kerava-Lahti railway line, Mommila was also served by the unnamed regional trains on the route Helsinki–Riihimäki–Lahti–Kouvola–Kotka Harbour.

References 

Hausjärvi
Thure Hellström railway stations
Railway stations opened in 1905
Railway stations in Kanta-Häme